Jürgen B. Hausmann (born 29 October 1964, in Alsdorf) is the stage name of Jürgen Beckers, a prominent German cabaret performer and comedian.

Jürgen B. Hausmann is a teacher at a gymnasium in the city of Würselen near Aachen, educating his students in the Latin and Greek language as well as in history. As a boy he had his first humoristic performances at the Carnival. Since 1999 Jürgen B. Hausmann is known for his one-man-show on various stages throughout the Rhineland.

References

External links 
 Jürgen B. Hausmann alias Jürgen Beckers
 Wochenspiegel

Comedy theatre characters
German cabaret performers
German male comedians
Theatre characters introduced in 1999
Male characters in theatre
People from Aachen (district)
Living people
1964 births